Jeandet is a French surname. Notable people with the surname include:

Cristian Jeandet (born 1975), Argentine footballer
Édouard Jeandet, French rower
Louis Jeandet, French rower

See also
Victor Muffat-Jeandet (born 1989), French alpine skier

French-language surnames